Leeland may refer to:

Leeland McElroy (born 1974), American football player
Leeland Dayton Mooring (born 1988), American singer-songwriter and musician
Leeland Pete or Lee Pete (1924–2010), American sports-talk radio broadcaster and college athlete

See also
Leland § People
Leyland § People